Belvedere Park may refer to:
Belvedere Park, Georgia, U.S.
Belvedere Park, California, U.S.
Belvedere Park, Seattle, Washington, U.S. (see List of parks in Seattle)
Belvedere Park, Victoria, Australia
Belvedere Park, Tunis, Tunisia